Faras is both a surname and a given name. 
Notable people with the name include:

Given name
Faras Hamdan (1910 - 1966), Arab politician
Faras Saleh, Iraqi basketball player.

Surname
Ahmed Faras (born 1946), Moroccan footballer
João Faras, astrologer, astronomer, physician

See also

Faraz
Faraaz